Sabra sinica is a moth in the family Drepanidae. It was described by Yang in 1978. It is found in China.

References

Moths described in 1978
Drepaninae